This is a list of airports and airfields in Bosnia and Herzegovina.

Bosnia and Herzegovina has: 
 4 International airports (one main airport; Sarajevo International Airport)
 1 International airport under construction Bihać Golubić Airport
 20 airfields of which; 14 have grass runways and 6 have asphalt runways

Statistics

Passenger statistics 
Statistics data for all International airports in Bosnia and Herzegovina.

Source: Bosnia and Herzegovina Directorate of Civil Aviation

Market share

Market share 

Statistics data for all international airports in Bosnia and Herzegovina.
Source: Bosnia and Herzegovina Directorate of Civil Aviation 

Statistics data for all international airports in Bosnia and Herzegovina.
Source: Bosnia and Herzegovina Directorate of Civil Aviation

Airports and Airfields

Airports and Airfields 

Airport names shown in bold indicate the airport has scheduled service on commercial airlines.

See also 
 Transport in Bosnia and Herzegovina
 Bosnia and Herzegovina Air Force
 List of airports by ICAO code: L#LQ – Bosnia and Herzegovina
 Wikipedia:WikiProject Aviation/Airline destination lists: Europe#Bosnia and Herzegovina

References 

 Bosnia and Herzegovina Directorate of Civil Aviation 
 Location Indicators in Bosnia and Herzegovina
 
 
  – includes IATA codes
  – ICAO codes
  – IATA and ICAO codes

 
Bosnia and Herzegovina
Airports
Airports
Bosnia and Herzgovina